The 2016 NATC trials season was the 43rd season. It consisted of eight trials events in four main classes: Pro, Expert and Women's Expert Sportsman West and East. It began on 21 May, with round one in Florida and ended with round eight in Colorado on 26 June.

Season summary
Spaniard Marc Friexa would claim his first NATC Trials Championship in 2016.

2016 NATC trials season calendar

Scoring system
Points were awarded to the top twenty finishers in each class. All eight rounds counted for the Pro class and Expert class, and the best of three in the Women's East and West classes were counted.

NATC Pro final standings

{|
|

NATC Expert final standings

{|
|

NATC East Women's Expert Sportsman final standings

{|
|

NATC West Women's Expert Sportsman final standings

{|
|

References

Motorcycle trials
2016 in motorcycle sport